Jaakko Loukko (25 February 1870, Ylistaro - 17 September 1946) was a Finnish farmer and politician. He was a member of the Parliament of Finland, representing the Finnish Party from May to November 1918 and the Agrarian League from November 1918 to April 1924.

External links
 Parliament of Finland

1870 births
1946 deaths
People from Seinäjoki
People from Vaasa Province (Grand Duchy of Finland)
Finnish Party politicians
Centre Party (Finland) politicians
Members of the Parliament of Finland (1917–19)
Members of the Parliament of Finland (1919–22)
Members of the Parliament of Finland (1922–24)